Maillardville is a community on the south slope of the city of Coquitlam, British Columbia, Canada.

History
In 1889, Frank Ross and James McLaren opened what would become Maillardville, a $350,000, modern lumber mill on the north bank of the Fraser River. By 1908, a mill town of 20 houses, a store, post office, hospital, office block, barber shop, pool hall and a Sikh temple had grown around the mill. A mill manager's residence was built that later became Place des Arts. A second mill manager's residence was built in 1909 and is now known as Mackin House, a historic house museum operated by the Coquitlam Heritage Society.

In 1909, Ross and McLaren, in search of workers for the Canadian Western Lumber Company, recruited a contingent of 110 French Canadian mill workers from Eastern Ontario and Quebec. Approximately 40 French Canadian families settled in present-day Maillardville in 1909, with another contingent arriving in June 1910. Named for Father Edmond Maillard, a young Oblate from France, it became the largest Francophone centre west of Manitoba. Similarly, in the early 1900s, many Punjabis came to work in the mills and settled on the south slope of Coquitlam.

In 1971, the City of Coquitlam and the Village of Fraser Mills were amalgamated, which gave the city a larger tax base. The mill closed in 2001, and is now rezoned into a residential area. Maillardville's past is recognized today in street names, the Francophone education system and French immersion programs, French-language guides and scouts, and celebrations such as Festival du Bois.

Maillardville celebrated its 100th birthday in 2009.

In 2014, the City of Coquitlam updated the Maillardville neighbourhood plan. The city anticipates a population growth of 6,000 over the next two decades.

Geography
Maillardville is bordered by Austin Avenue to the north and Lougheed Highway to the south. To the west it is flanked by Blue Mountain Street, while to the east it is bordered by Mundy Road. The town centre of Maillardville is situated in the southwest corner of the neighbourhood, on Brunette Avenue between Lougheed Highway and Woolridge Street.

Demographics

Population

Ethnicity

Language

Media
They Dream, a Canadian feature-length film, set in and around Maillardville, including Place des Arts and Mackin House Museum, was shot over the summer of 2012. Written and directed by Vancouver filmmaker Gord Stanfield, They Dream is the story of a 20-year-old art student, David Dubois, his love affair with a mysterious woman Lisa Reese, and his tragic past. Jean Ory reminds David he can't escape the truth. Lisa and Jean were lifetime residents of Maillardville. They Dream'''s lead cast includes Jason Mireau, Delia Tatiana and Moishe Teichman.

Notable people
 Lucille Starr, who was inducted to the Canadian Country Music Hall of Fame in 1987 began her musical career in Maillardville with the group Les Hirondelles''. A street in Coquitlam "Lucille Starr Way" is named in her honour.
 Shawn Farquhar, magician

See also
 Franco-Columbian

References

External links
 Maillardville.com
 Maillardville, a francophone community in British Columbia
 Les Archives Authentiques de Maillardville 

Neighbourhoods in Coquitlam
Ethnic enclaves in British Columbia